Tyler-Jane Mitchel (born Rebecca Jane Clark, known professionally as Tyler Jane) is a New Zealand actress best known for her role as Sheree Greegan in the New Zealand drama Outrageous Fortune.

Career
Mitchel is an actor, voice over artist, producer and broadcaster. She has starred in several television series in New Zealand, including Amazing Extraordinary Friends and Outrageous Fortune, and worked as a radio newsreader at Auckland’s George FM.

Mitchel has also been an advertising pitchwoman, most notably as the presenter of skin care products brand Elave's 2007 "Nothing to Hide" viral marketing campaign, for which she appeared completely nude in an online commercial as well as on an associated interactive website.

Filmography

Television

Film

References

External links
 

New Zealand film actresses
New Zealand television actresses
Living people
1975 births